Urusovskaya is a rural locality (a village) and the administrative center of Nizhnekuloyskoye Rural Settlement, Verkhovazhsky District, Vologda Oblast, Russia. The population was 448 as of 2002. There are 17 streets.

Geography 
Urusovskaya is located 38 km southeast of Verkhovazhye (the district's administrative centre) by road. Dyakonovskaya is the nearest rural locality.

References 

Rural localities in Verkhovazhsky District